Zerach Warhaftig (also Zorah Wahrhaftig; 2 February 1906 - 26 September 2002) was an Israeli rabbi, lawyer, and politician. He was a signatory of Israel's Declaration of Independence.

Biography
Zerach Warhaftig was born in Volkovysk, in the Russian Empire (today Vawkavysk, Belarus) in 1906. His parents were Yerucham Warhaftig and Rivka Fainstein. He studied law at the University of Warsaw, and later became a Doctor of Law from the Hebrew University.

At the start of World War II, Rabbi Warhaftig was among those who convinced the Japanese Vice-Consul in Kaunas, Lithuania, Chiune Sugihara, to issue transit visas for the entire Mir Yeshiva. Warhaftig and most students of the Mir Yeshiva received a "Curaçao visa" from the Dutch consul Jan Zwartendijk, which gave them an official travel destination. This allowed Sugihara to issue Japanese transit visa. By so doing, Zwartendijk and Sugihara saved thousands of lives and families from the Nazis who had occupied first Poland and then Lithuania. In 1940 Warhaftig and his family travelled east from Lithuania to Japan. On 5 June 1941 the Warhaftigs left Yokohama on the Japanese ocean liner Hikawa Maru and on 17 June they landed at Vancouver, Canada. He described the trip as "a summer vacation and with the war seeming to be so far away" although, he said "I didn't have a peaceful mind because of the strong responsibility I had to help the Jewish refugees with the troubles they faced."

In 1947, Warhaftig immigrated to Mandatory Palestine. Initially he joined the Hapoel HaMizrachi party, a religious-zionist party, and in 1949 he was elected to the first Knesset as part of the United Religious Front, an alliance between Mizrachi, Hapoel HaMizrachi, Agudat Yisrael and Poalei Agudat Yisrael. In 1948-1963 he taught Jewish Law at the Hebrew University of Jerusalem.

The party contended in the 1951 elections alone. Although it won only two seats, it was included in David Ben-Gurion's coalition, and Warhaftig was appointed Deputy Minister of Religions in the fourth government. In 1956, Hapoel HaMizrachi and Mizrachi merged to form the National Religious Party. Warhaftig led the party and retained his ministerial role until the end of the third Knesset.

After the 1961 elections (the fifth Knesset) he was appointed Minister of Religions, a position he held until 1974. In 1981 he retired from the Knesset.

In 1970, he was elected chairman of the curatorium of Bar-Ilan University.

Awards and recognition
In 1983 Warhaftig was awarded the Israel Prize, for his special contribution to society and the State of Israel in the advancement of Hebrew law.
In 1989 he received the Yakir Yerushalayim (Worthy Citizen of Jerusalem) award from the city of Jerusalem.

The Dr. Zerah Warhaftig Institute for Research on Religious Zionism at Bar Ilan University is named for him.

See also
Members of the first Knesset
Michael Dennis Rohan
Chiune Sugihara
List of Israel Prize recipients

References

Published works
“A Constitution for Israel” an article in Yavne Compilation: Political Problems in Israel pgs 17-21, (Hebrew, April 1949)
“On Rabbinical Judgments in Israel” (collected speeches) (Hebrew, 1956)
“Legal Issues in the Talmud” (from lectures) (Hebrew, 1957)
Editor with Shlomo Zeven: “Remembrance: a Torah Collection in Memory of Rabbi Yizhak HaLevi Herzog” (Hebrew, 1962)
“Chattel in Jewish Law” (Hebrew, 1964)
“Problems of State and Religion” (articles and speeches) (Hebrew, 1973)
Edited: “Religion and State in Legislation: A Collection of Laws and Rulings” (Hebrew, 1973)
“The Declaration of Independence and Orders for the Order of Government and the Judiciary (1948 and Problems of Religion and State)” in The Book of Shragai (Hebrew, 1982)
“Refugee and Remnant during the Holocaust” (Hebrew, 1984)
“Researches in Jewish Law” (Hebrew, 1985)
“A Constitution for Israel – Religion and State” (Hebrew, 1988)

External links

1906 births
2002 deaths
20th-century Israeli lawyers
20th-century Israeli non-fiction writers
20th-century Polish lawyers
Deputy ministers of Israel
Government ministers of Israel
Ministers of Religious affairs of Israel
Hapoel HaMizrachi politicians
Hebrew University of Jerusalem Faculty of Law alumni
Israel Prize for special contribution to society and the State recipients
Israel Prize Rabbi recipients
Israeli Ashkenazi Jews
Israeli male writers
Israeli Orthodox rabbis
Jewish Israeli politicians
Jewish National Council members
Jews from the Russian Empire
Lithuanian emigrants to Mandatory Palestine
Members of the 1st Knesset (1949–1951)
Members of the 2nd Knesset (1951–1955)
Members of the 3rd Knesset (1955–1959)
Members of the 4th Knesset (1959–1961)
Members of the 5th Knesset (1961–1965)
Members of the 6th Knesset (1965–1969)
Members of the 7th Knesset (1969–1974)
Members of the 8th Knesset (1974–1977)
Members of the 9th Knesset (1977–1981)
National Religious Party politicians
People from Vawkavysk
Polish emigrants to Mandatory Palestine
Rabbinic members of the Knesset
Signatories of the Israeli Declaration of Independence
Sugihara's Jews
United Religious Front politicians
University of Warsaw alumni